Culver's Lake (formerly Round Pond) is a lake located in Frankford Township, in Sussex County, New Jersey.  Fed by Lake Owassa and Bear Swamp, Culver's Lake is the source of the West Branch of the Paulins Kill (also known as the "Culver Brook").  In the late 19th and early 20th century, the lake was used for seasonal recreation.  Today, it is a private year-round community owned and operated by the Normanoch Association, a homeowners' association.

It is located near the Culver Gap, a wind gap in Kittatinny Mountain, and where the Appalachian Trail intersects with U.S. Route 206.

Culver Gap near Culver's Lake in Sussex County, New Jersey, was an important route through the Kittatinny Mountain from about 10,000 years ago to present. The gap is more than 400 feet (120 m) below the top of the mountain. Lenape Native Americans used the gap to hunt and trade on both sides of the mountain. Early settlers from Pennsylvania used the water drop from Culvers Lake to Branchville for a wide assortment of mills. Turnpikes followed the route of Lenape trails through the gap.

The lake is named for a local clergyman, the Reverend Jabez Collver (1731-1818), who led the Congregational Church in Wantage Township, New Jersey.  On September 14, 1774, he purchased 163 acres of land east of Kittatinny Mountain near the lake.  However, after the American Revolution, Collver fled to Ontario, Canada after the American Revolution due to his loyalist sympathies.

References

External links
 The Normanoch Association (the private lake community homeowners' association)

Culver's Lake
Lakes of Sussex County, New Jersey
Paulins Kill watershed
Frankford Township, New Jersey